The Royal Botanic Garden Edinburgh (RBGE) is a scientific centre for the study of plants, their diversity and conservation, as well as a popular tourist attraction. Founded in 1670 as a physic garden to grow medicinal plants, today it occupies four sites across Scotland—Edinburgh, Dawyck, Logan and Benmore—each with its own specialist collection. The RBGE's living collection consists of more than 13,302 plant species (34,422 accessions), whilst the herbarium contains in excess of 3 million preserved specimens.

The Royal Botanic Garden Edinburgh is an executive non-departmental public body of the Scottish Government. The Edinburgh site is the main garden and the headquarters of the public body, which is led by Regius Keeper Simon Milne.

History
The Edinburgh botanic garden was founded in 1670 at St. Anne's Yard, near Holyrood Palace, by Dr. Robert Sibbald and Dr. Andrew Balfour. It is the second oldest botanic garden in the UK after Oxford's. The plant collection used as the basis of the garden was the private collection of Sir Patrick Murray, 2nd Lord Elibank, moved from his home at Livingston Peel in 1672 following his death in September 1671. The original site was "obtained of John Brown, gardener of the North Yardes in the Holyrood Abby, an inclosure of some 40 foot of measure every way. By what we procured from Levingstone and other gardens, we made a collection of eight or nine hundred plants yr." This site proved too small, and in 1676 grounds belonging to Trinity Hospital were leased by Balfour from the City Council: this second garden was sited just to the east of the Nor Loch, down from the High Street. 

In the spring of 1689, for certain strategic military reasons, the Nor Loch which lay west of the Physic Garden was drained, resulting in the flooding of the garden (which at this stage had wholly relocated to the Trinity Hospital site), with much mud and general rubbish being deposited, to the ruination of many of the plants. Partly for this reason and partly due to necessary expansion the facility relocated to the Holyrood site in 1695.

John Ainslie's 1804 map shows it as the "Old Physick Garden" to the east of the North Bridge. The site was subsequently occupied by tracks of the North British Railway, and a plaque at platform 11 of the Waverley railway station marks its location.

In 1763, the garden's collections were moved away from the city's pollution to a larger (five acre) "Physick Garden" on the west side of Leith Walk, covering the area now called Bellevue, all under the control of Prof John Hope. This site is shown in Ainslie's 1804 map. The site is today known as Hopetoun Crescent Gardens and is one of the collection of New Town Gardens.

Some time prior to Hope's death (1786) he was brought Turkish rhubarb seeds by Bruce of Kinnaird and this was the first rhubarb grown in Great Britain. As this proved successful over 3000 plants were grown as rhubarb was previously an expensive import (used as a medicine).

A cottage from the garden's original site remained on Leith Walk for over one hundred years. In 2008, the building was moved brick by brick to a site within the current gardens. The project was completed in 2016.  The garden was a popular destination for botanists and supplied plants to other gardens such as Kew. Hope erected a monument to Carl Linnaeus on the site in 1778.

In the early 1820s under the direction of the Curator, William McNab, the garden moved west to its present location (adjacent to Inverleith Row), and the Leith Walk site was built over between Hopetoun Crescent and Haddington Place. The Temperate Palm House, which remains the tallest in Scotland, was built in 1858.

In 1877, the city acquired Inverleith House from the estate of Cosmo Innes and added it to the existing gardens, opening the remodelled grounds to the public in 1881.

The botanic garden at Benmore became the first Regional Garden of the RBGE in 1929. It was followed by the gardens at Logan and Dawyck in 1969 and 1978.

Notable staff and residents

John Hope, Keeper of the Leith Walk site
John Mackay (1772-1802), laid out the Leith Walk site
Dr William Roxburgh, Keeper in 1814
Francis Buchanan, Keeper from 1814 to 1829
Cosmo Innes, original owner of Inverleith House
Daniel Rutherford, Keeper
William Wright Smith, Regius Keeper
Robert Graham, Regius Keeper
Roland Edgar Cooper, curator
George Taylor, director
John Hutton Balfour, lived in Inverleith House
Isaac Bayley Balfour, linked to site
William Evans, born here (son of William Wilson Evans, Curator)
Harold Roy Fletcher, Regius Keeper
William Gregor MacKenzie, Curator, Chelsea Physic Garden
Matthew Young Orr, botanist
Douglas Mackay Henderson, 12th Regius Keeper

The garden at Edinburgh

The Botanic Garden's main site in Edinburgh is a hugely important player in a worldwide network of institutions seeking to ensure that biodiversity is not further eroded.

The RBGE is actively involved in, and coordinates numerous in situ and ex situ conservation projects both in the UK and internationally. The three main cross-cutting themes of scientific work at the RBGE are: Scottish Biodiversity, Plants & Climate Change, and Conservation.

In addition to the RBGE's scientific activities the garden remains a popular destination for both tourists and locals. Locally known as "The Botanics", the garden is a popular place to go for a walk, particularly with young families. Entrance to the botanic garden is free, although a small entry charge exists for the glasshouses. During the year the garden hosts many events including live performances, guided tours and exhibitions. The RBGE is also an important centre for education, offering taught courses across all levels.

In 2009, the John Hope Gateway was opened. John Hope was the first Regius Keeper of RBGE.

Living collection

Nearly 273,000 individual plants are grown at the Botanics in Edinburgh or its three smaller satellite gardens (known as Regional Gardens) located in other parts of Scotland. These represent around 13,300 species from all over the world, or about 4% of all known plant species.

The RBGE Living Collection catalogue is available here and updated nightly.

Some notable collections at the botanic garden Edinburgh include:
Alpine Plants
Chinese Hillside
Cryptogamic Garden
The Glasshouses
Palmhouse
Temperate Palms
Tropical Palms
Orchids and Cycads
Ferns and Fossils
Plants and people (including Giant Water Lily pond)
Temperate lands
Rainforest Riches
Arid Lands
Montane tropical house (including Carnivorous plants)
Wet Tropical House
Peat Walls
The Queen Mother's memorial garden.
Rock Garden
Scottish Heath Garden
Woodland Garden

Herbarium
The RBGE herbarium (situated in a purpose built facility at the Edinburgh site) is considered a world-leading botanical collection, housing in excess of 3 million specimens. Prior to the formation of the Herbarium, plant collections tended to be the private property of the Regius Keeper. The Herbarium in its present form came with the fusion of the collections of the University of Edinburgh and the Botanical Society of Edinburgh in 1839–40. RBGE's Herbarium moved into its present, purpose-built home in 1964.

Over the years, a large number of collections have been added, belonging to individuals such as R.K. Greville and John Hutton Balfour, and institutions including the Universities of Glasgow, St Andrews and Hull. The most important historical collection is that of George Walker Arnott, which came with the University of Glasgow's foreign herbarium deposited on permanent loan in 1965. This collection contains specimens from all the major mid-19th century collectors, especially from India, North and South America, and South Africa, including type material of species described by 'Hooker & Arnott'. From the early 20th century, collections have been made by members of staff.

Approx a third of the herbarium is in a searchable database. The Index Herbariorum code assigned to the RBGE herbarium is E and it is used when citing housed specimens.

Library
RBGE's Library is Scotland's national reference collection for specialist botanical and horticultural resources. Housing around 70,000 books and 150,000 periodicals, the research library is one of the country's largest. It has been built up to support the specific subject fields researched and taught at RBGE. Garden staff and students are its main users, along with visiting researchers. However, as a national reference collection, the Library is also open to members of the public, either in person or by telephone or e-mail.

Inverleith House
Inverleith House is an 18th-century building, located centrally in the modern botanic gardens. From 1960 to 1984 it was the original base of the Scottish National Gallery of Modern Art, with exhibits in the house and in the gardens, before it moved to larger premises in Belford Road. Since then, Inverleith House has functioned as a contemporary art gallery, showing a programme of temporary exhibitions by invited artists. Its spring programmes feature works and specimens from the historical collections of the Botanics, together with exhibitions by modern and contemporary artists. The gallery is curated by the Royal Botanic Garden Edinburgh.

Regional specialist gardens

Benmore

Situated on the West Coast of Scotland, Benmore Botanic Garden experiences a wetter and milder oceanic climate than the main site in Edinburgh. Benmore grows trees and shrubs from high rainfall areas, especially conifers and rhododendrons. Highlights of the collection include an avenue of Sequoiadendron and a recently refurbished Fernery, exhibiting rare ferns from both Britain and abroad.

Dawyck

Situated to the south of the Scottish Border town of Peebles, Dawyck Botanic Garden is particularly suitable for hardy plants from the world's cooler, drier areas. Dawyck is also renowned for its high diversity of fungi and cryptogamics.

Logan

Logan, Scotland's most exotic garden, has an almost sub-tropical climate, and provides ideal growing conditions for southern hemisphere plants.

Royal Botanic Garden Edinburgh Medal

The Royal Botanic Garden Edinburgh Medal, instituted in 2010, is awarded from time to time to recognise an outstanding individual contribution in any field related to the work of the RBGE (either by a member of staff or by any other person).  The medal, struck in silver, has a sibbaldia motif on one face and a portrait of Robert Sibbald on the other.

2010: Edward Kemp
2011: Sir Tim Smit
2013: Vernon H. Heywood
2015: Peter H. Raven
2022: Jin Chen
2023: Sandra Díaz

Gallery

See also

Royal Caledonian Horticultural Society
DoCoMoMo Key Scottish Monuments
Gardens in Scotland
List of botanical gardens in the United Kingdom
List of Category A listed buildings in Edinburgh
List of post-war Category A listed buildings in Scotland
Prospect 100 best modern Scottish buildings

References

External links

 
 Edinburgh Journal of Botany / Royal Botanic Garden Edinburgh at HathiTrust Digital Library
 Edinburgh Journal of Botany at SCImago Journal Rank
 Botanical Scientific Journals

 

 
Parks and commons in Edinburgh
Botanic Garden
Gardens in Edinburgh
Tourist attractions in Edinburgh
1670 establishments in Scotland
Book publishing companies of Scotland
Libraries in Edinburgh
Inventory of Gardens and Designed Landscapes
Research organisations in Scotland